The 2015–16 season was the 4th season of the Bratislava-based club HC Slovan Bratislava in the Kontinental Hockey League. On July 2 it was officially announced that Slovan would continue playing in the KHL, with Miloš Říha appointed head coach. Tomáš Surový was appointed team captain with Ladislav Nagy and Michal Sersen as alternate captains.

Schedule and results

Pre-season
The pre-season schedule was announced on July 12, 2015.

|-bgcolor= ddffdd
|1||July 22|| Salavat Yulaev|| 2–3 ||Slovan Bratislava|| Maribor, Slovenia||||
|-bgcolor= ddffdd
|2||July 24|| Salavat Yulaev|| 2–3||Slovan Bratislava|| Maribor, Slovenia||||
|-bgcolor= ddffdd
|3||July 28|| Slovan Bratislava || 2–1 ||  Torpedo Nizhny Novgorod|| Kajot Arena, Brno||||
|-bgcolor= d0e7ff
|4||August 4|| Slovan Bratislava || 5 – 4 SO||  Kometa Brno || Slovnaft Arena ||6,355||
|-bgcolor= d0e7ff
|5||August 6|| Slovan Bratislava || 3 – 2 SO ||  PSG Zlín|| Slovnaft Arena ||4,673||
|-bgcolor= ffbbbb
|6||August 8|| Slovan Bratislava || 1–3 ||  Medveščak Zagreb|| Slovnaft Arena ||5,043||
|-bgcolor= ffbbbb
|7||August 11||  Kometa Brno  ||5–1 || Slovan Bratislava || Kajot Arena ||||
|-bgcolor= ddffdd
|8||August 13||  PSG Zlín  ||2–3 || Slovan Bratislava || Zimní stadion Luďka Čajky ||||
|-bgcolor= ddffdd
|9||August 18||  Vítkovice Steel  || 3–6 || Slovan Bratislava || ČEZ Aréna ||||
|-bgcolor= ddffdd
|10||August 21||  HKm Zvolen  || 1–6 || Slovan Bratislava || Steiger Aréna ||||
|-

|-
| align="center"|

Regular season

|-bgcolor= ffbbbb
|1||26||Slovan Bratislava|| 1–3 ||Admiral Vladivostok || Garnett ||Slovnaft Arena || 9,270 ||0–0–0–1||
|-bgcolor= ffbbbb
|2||28||Slovan Bratislava||0–1||Amur Khabarovsk || Garnett  || Slovnaft Arena || 7,218||0–0–0–2||
|-bgcolor= ddffdd
|3||30||Slovan Bratislava||6–0||Metallurg Novokuznetsk ||Garnett || Slovnaft Arena ||6,875||1–0–0–2||
|-

|-bgcolor= ffbbbb
|4||1||Slovan Bratislava|| 2–3 ||Sibir Novosibirsk || Garnett ||Slovnaft Arena || 7,547 ||1–0–0–3||
|-bgcolor= ddffdd
|5||6||Slovan Bratislava|| 3–2 || Medveščak Zagreb || Brust||Slovnaft Arena || 8,123 ||2–0–0–3||
|-bgcolor= ddffdd
|6||10||Dynamo Moscow|| 1–2||Slovan Bratislava || Brust  ||Luzhniki || 6,170 ||3–0–0–3||
|-bgcolor= ddffdd
|7||12||HC Vityaz|| 2–5 ||Slovan Bratislava || Garnett ||Podolsk Hero Arena || 3,500 || 4–0–0–3 || 
|-bgcolor= d0e7ff
|8||14||  Medveščak Zagreb|| 2 – 3 OT ||Slovan Bratislava || Brust ||Dom Sportova || 5,000 || 4–1–0–3 || 
|-bgcolor= ffeeaa
|9||17|| Slovan Bratislava || 1 – 2 OT || SKA St. Petersburg || Garnett ||Slovnaft Arena || 10,055 || 4–1–1–3 || 
|-bgcolor= ffbbbb
|10||19|| Slovan Bratislava || 2–5 || Spartak Moscow || Garnett ||Slovnaft Arena || 9,329 || 4–1–1–4 || 
|-bgcolor= d0e7ff
|11||21|| Slovan Bratislava || 3 – 2 OT ||  Dinamo Riga || Brust ||Slovnaft Arena || 7,577 || 4–2–1–4 || 
|-bgcolor= ffbbbb
|12||23||  Jokerit Helsinki || 4–1 || Slovan Bratislava || Brust ||Hartwall Arena || 9,503  || 4–2–1–5 || 
|-bgcolor= d0e7ff
|13||25||   Dinamo Riga || 1 – 2 SO || Slovan Bratislava || Garnett ||Arena Riga || 7,586  || 4–3–1–5 || 
|-bgcolor= ffbbbb
|14||28||  Slovan Bratislava || 0–3 || Neftekhimik Nizhnekamsk || Brust ||Slovnaft Arena || 7,080  || 4–3–1–6 || 
|-bgcolor= ffbbbb
|15||30||  Slovan Bratislava || 1–3 || Traktor Chelyabinsk || Garnett ||Slovnaft Arena || 6,883  || 4–3–1–7 || 
|-

|-bgcolor= ffeeaa
|16||2||Slovan Bratislava|| 3 – 4 OT ||Salavat Yulaev Ufa || Brust ||Slovnaft Arena || 7,820 ||4–3–2–7||
|-bgcolor= ffbbbb
|17||4||Slovan Bratislava|| 2–5 ||Metallurg Magnitogorsk || Garnett ||Slovnaft Arena || 8,342 ||4–3–2–8||
|-bgcolor= ffbbbb
|18||7||Salavat Yulaev Ufa|| 3–2 ||Slovan Bratislava || Garnett, Brust ||Ufa Arena || 5,503 ||4–3–2–9||
|-bgcolor= ddffdd
|19||9||Metallurg Magnitogorsk|| 2–3 ||Slovan Bratislava || Brust ||Arena Metallurg || 5,785 ||5–3–2–9||
|-bgcolor= ffbbbb
|20||11||Lada Togliatti|| 2–1 ||Slovan Bratislava || Brust ||Lada Arena || 3,289 ||5–3–2–10||
|-bgcolor= ddffdd
|21||13||Ak Bars Kazan|| 0–1 ||Slovan Bratislava || Brust ||TatNeft Arena || 7,157 ||6–3–2–10||
|-bgcolor= ddffdd
|22||17||Slovan Bratislava|| 6–0 ||HC Ugra || Brust ||Slovnaft Arena || 8,440 ||7–3–2–10||
|-bgcolor= d0e7ff
|23||19||Slovan Bratislava|| 4 – 3 SO ||Avtomobilist Yekaterinburg || Brust ||Slovnaft Arena || 7,143 ||7–4–2–10||
|-bgcolor= ddffdd
|24||21||Slovan Bratislava|| 5–3  ||Barys Astana || Garnett ||Slovnaft Arena || 7,862 ||8–4–2–10||
|-bgcolor= ffbbbb
|25||23||Slovan Bratislava|| 0–3  ||Avangard Omsk || Garnett ||Slovnaft Arena || 10,055 ||8–4–2–11||
|-bgcolor= d0e7ff
|26||26|| Dinamo Minsk|| 3 – 4 SO ||Slovan Bratislava || Brust ||Arena Metallurg || 9,726 ||8–5–2–11||
|-bgcolor= ffbbbb
|27||28||Slovan Bratislava|| 2–5 ||Lada Togliatti || Brust, Garnett ||Slovnaft Arena || 7,887 ||8–5–2–12||
|-bgcolor= ffeeaa
|28||30||Slovan Bratislava|| 1 – 2 SO ||Ak Bars Kazan || Brust ||Slovnaft Arena || 8,854 ||8–5–3–12||
|-

|-bgcolor= ffbbbb
|29||1|| Medveščak Zagreb|| 6–2 ||Slovan Bratislava || Brust ||Dom Sportova || 5,390 ||8–5–3–13||
|-bgcolor= ffbbbb
|30||10||Torpedo Nizhny Novgorod|| 5–3 ||Slovan Bratislava || Garnett ||Trade Union Sport Palace || 5,200 ||8–5–3–14||
|-bgcolor= ffbbbb
|31||12|| Dinamo Minsk|| 2–1 ||Slovan Bratislava || Brust ||Minsk-Arena || 8,529 ||8–5–3–15||
|-bgcolor= d0e7ff
|32||14||Slovan Bratislava|| 3 – 2 SO ||CSKA Moscow || Brust ||Slovnaft Arena || 10,055 ||8–6–3–15||
|-bgcolor= ddffdd
|33||16||Slovan Bratislava|| 5–4 ||Severstal Cherepovets || Brust ||Slovnaft Arena || 9,284 ||9–6–3–15||
|-bgcolor= ddffdd
|34||19|| CSKA Moscow || 0–2 ||Slovan Bratislava || Garnett ||CSKA Ice Palace || 3,956 ||10–6–3–15||
|-bgcolor= ddffdd
|35||21|| Severstal Cherepovets || 1–2 ||Slovan Bratislava || Garnett ||Ice Palace ||4,463 ||11–6–3–15||
|-bgcolor= ddffdd
|36||24||Slovan Bratislava|| 4–1 || Dinamo Minsk || Garnett ||Slovnaft Arena || 9,332 ||12–6–3–15||
|-bgcolor= ddffdd
|37||29||HC Ugra|| 1–3 ||Slovan Bratislava || Garnett ||Arena Ugra || 3,000 ||13–6–3–15||
|-

|-bgcolor= ffbbbb
|38||1|| Avtomobilist Yekaterinburg|| 4–3 ||Slovan Bratislava || Garnett, Brust ||KRK Uralets || 3,390 ||13–6–3–16||
|-bgcolor= ffeeaa
|39||3|| Barys Astana|| 5–4 OT ||Slovan Bratislava || Garnett ||Barys Arena || 3,964 ||13–6–4–16||
|-bgcolor= ffbbbb
|40||5|| Avangard Omsk|| 5–3 ||Slovan Bratislava || Brust ||Omsk Arena || 8,270 ||13–6–4–17||
|-bgcolor= ffbbbb
|41||9|| Slovan Bratislava|| 4–5 ||HC Sochi || Brust ||Slovnaft Arena || 9,108 ||13–6–4–18||
|-bgcolor= ffbbbb
|42||11|| Slovan Bratislava|| 0–1 ||Lokomotiv Yaroslavl || Brust ||Slovnaft Arena || 10,055 ||13–6–4–19||
|-bgcolor= ddffdd
|43||22|| Slovan Bratislava|| 4–2 || Dinamo Minsk  || Brust ||Slovnaft Arena || 10,055 ||14–6–4–19||
|-bgcolor= ddffdd
|44||26|| Slovan Bratislava|| 3–0 || Torpedo Nizhny Novgorod  || Brust ||Slovnaft Arena || 10,055 ||15–6–4–19||
|-bgcolor= d0e7ff
|45||28|| Neftekhimik Nizhnekamsk|| 0–1 SO ||Slovan Bratislava || Brust ||Neftekhimik Ice Palace || 5,000 ||15–7–4–19||
|-bgcolor= d0e7ff
|46||30|| Traktor Chelyabinsk|| 1–2 SO ||Slovan Bratislava || Brust ||Traktor Ice Arena || 7,000 ||15–8–4–19||
|-

|-bgcolor= d0e7ff
|47||4||  Dinamo Riga|| 1–2 SO ||Slovan Bratislava || Brust ||Arena Riga || 3,888 ||15–9–4–19||
|-bgcolor= ddffdd
|48||6|| Slovan Bratislava || 4–2 ||  Jokerit Helsinki || Brust ||Slovnaft Arena || 10,055  || 16–9–4–19|| 
|-bgcolor= ddffdd
|49||11|| Spartak Moscow|| 0–4 ||Slovan Bratislava || Brust ||Sokolniki Arena || 4,103 ||17–9–4–19||
|-bgcolor= ffbbbb
|50||13|| SKA Saint Petersburg|| 3–2 ||Slovan Bratislava || Garnett ||Ice Palace || 11,046 ||17–9–4–20||
|-bgcolor= ddffdd
|51||16|| Slovan Bratislava || 4–2 ||  Vityaz || Brust ||Slovnaft Arena || 10,055  || 18–9–4–20|| 
|-bgcolor= ffbbbb
|52||18|| Slovan Bratislava || 3–4 ||  Dynamo Moscow || Brust ||Slovnaft Arena || 10,055  || 18–9–4–21|| 
|-bgcolor= ddffdd
|53||20|| Slovan Bratislava || 3–2 ||  Medveščak Zagreb || Brust ||Slovnaft Arena || 10,055  || 19–9–4–21||
|-bgcolor= ddffdd
|54||29|| Metallurg Novokuznetsk|| 2–3 ||Slovan Bratislava || Brust ||Sports Palace || 3,150 ||20–9–4–21||
|-bgcolor= ffbbbb
|55||29|| Sibir Novosibirsk|| 3–2 ||Slovan Bratislava || Brust ||Ice Sports Palace || 7,400 ||20–9–4–22||
|-

|-bgcolor= ddffdd
|56||2|| Admiral Vladivostok|| 1–3 ||Slovan Bratislava || Garnett ||Fetisov Arena || 5,309 ||21–9–4–22||
|-bgcolor= d0e7ff
|57||4|| Amur Khabarovsk|| 2–3 SO ||Slovan Bratislava || Garnett ||Platinum Arena || 6,900 ||21–10–4–22||
|-bgcolor= d0e7ff
|58||8|| Slovan Bratislava || 3–2 OT ||  Dinamo Riga || Brust ||Slovnaft Arena || 10,055  || 21–11–4–22||
|-bgcolor= ffbbbb
|59||16|| HC Sochi ||5 –2 ||  Slovan Bratislava  ||Garnett  ||Bolshoy Ice Dome || 6,789  ||21–11–4–23  ||
|-bgcolor= ffbbbb
|60||18|| Lokomotiv Yaroslavl || 5 – 1 ||  Slovan Bratislava  || Garnett ||Arena 2000 || 8,154 ||  21–11–4–24  ||
|-

|-
|align="center"|

Playoffs

|-bgcolor= ffbbbb
|-  style="text-align:center; background:#cfc;"
|-bgcolor= ffbbbb
|1 || 21 Feb || CSKA Moscow || 2 – 0 || Slovan Bratislava || Brust ||  CSKA Ice Palace || 4,463 || 0 – 1 || 
|-bgcolor= ffbbbb
|2 || 23 Feb || CSKA Moscow || 3 – 2 OT || Slovan Bratislava || Brust ||  CSKA Ice Palace || 5,073 || 0 – 2 || 
|-bgcolor= ffbbbb
|3 || 25 Feb || Slovan Bratislava || 1 – 2 || CSKA Moscow || Brust ||  Slovnaft Arena  || 10,055 || 0 – 3 || 
|-bgcolor= ffbbbb
|4 || 27 Feb ||Slovan Bratislava  || 1 – 3 || CSKA Moscow || Brust ||  Slovnaft Arena  || 10,055  || 0 – 4 || []
|-

|-
| align="center"|

Standings

Western Conference

Player statistics

Goaltenders

Skaters

Team statistics
All statistics are for regular season only.

Notes

Source:

Roster changes

Players Joining

Players Leaving

Player signings
This is the list of all players that extended their contracts with HC Slovan Bratislava:

Players lost via retirement

Draft picks
Slovan's picks at the 2015 KHL Junior Draft.

See also
HC Slovan Bratislava all-time KHL record
List of HC Slovan Bratislava seasons

References

Bratislava
HC Slovan Bratislava seasons
Bratislava